Faith is a 1920 American silent romantic drama film directed by Howard M. Mitchell and starring Peggy Hyland, J. Parks Jones, Guy Edward Hearn, and Winter Hall. The film was released by Fox Film Corporation on February 1920.

Cast
Peggy Hyland as Peggy Laughlin
J. Parks Jones as David Harden
Guy Edward Hearn as Dr. George Kyle
Winter Hall as Adam Harden
Edwin B. Tilton as Sir Kent MacGregor
Milla Davenport as Meg Harper
Fred Herzog as Sandy Burns

Preservation
The film is now considered lost.

References

External links

1920 romantic drama films
Fox Film films
American romantic drama films
1920 films
American silent feature films
American black-and-white films
Lost American films
Lost romantic drama films
1920s American films
Silent romantic drama films
Silent American drama films